Midrash Tanhuma  is the name given to three different collections of Pentateuch aggadot; two are extant, while the third is known only through citations. These midrashim, although bearing the name of R. Tanḥuma, must not be regarded as having been written or edited by him. They were so named merely because they consist partly of homilies originating with him (this being indicated by the introductory formula "Thus began R. Tanḥuma" or "Thus preached R. Tanḥuma") and partly of homilies by aggadic teachers who followed the style of R. Tanḥuma. It is possible that R. Tanḥuma himself preserved his homilies, and that his collection was used by the editors of the midrash. The three collections were edited at different times; they will, therefore, be treated in chronological order. According to Samuel Berman's most recent research and translation on Midrash-Tanhuma, the "earliest manuscript of this text was compiled in late 8th or 9th century".

Tanḥuma A 
Tanḥuma A, also called Tanchuma Buber, is the collection published by S. Buber, who gathered the material from several manuscripts. Buber claimed that this collection, consisting of homilies on and aggadic interpretations of the weekly sections of the Pentateuch, was the oldest of the three, perhaps even the oldest compilation of its kind arranged as a running commentary on the Pentateuch, and he identified several passages which he saw as being quoted by Bereshit Rabbah. Buber postulated that this midrash (Tanḥuma) was edited in the 5th century, before the completion of the Babylonian Talmud. Buber cites a passage in the Babylonian Talmud that seems to indicate that the redactor of that work had referred to the Midrash Tanḥuma. Other scholars disagree, however, and do not see the Buber recension of Tanchuma as being older than the other versions.  Townsend cites a section from Buber's recension which appears to be a quote from Sherira Gaon's Sheiltot (8th century).

This passage says that two amoraim differed in their interpretations of the words "and they looked after Moses, until he was gone into the tabernacle" One amora interpreted the words in a complimentary sense, while the other held that the people looked after Moses and made unfavorable remarks about him. The favorable interpretation only is given in the Talmud, while the adverse opinion is referred to with the words "ki de-ita" (as it is said). Inasmuch as the adverse view is given in the Tanḥuma Peḳude, it is extremely probable that the words "ki de-ita" in the Talmud have reference to the former work, or that the reference originally read "ki de-ita be-Tanḥuma" (as it is said in the Tanḥuma), the words "be-Tanḥuma" having been eliminated later.

The homilies contained in Midrash Tanḥuma A begin with the words "As the Scriptures say" or sometimes "As it is written." Then follow a verse (in most cases taken from the Hagiographa), its explanation, and a homily on the particular passage of the Pentateuch referred to. Several of the homilies on the first, third, and fourth books of the Pentateuch begin with brief halakhic dissertations bearing on the passages to which the homilies refer. The halakhic treatises consist of a question introduced with the words "Yelammedenu rabbenu" (May our teacher instruct us), and of a reply beginning with the phrase "Kak shanu rabbotenu" (Thus have our teachers instructed us); the replies are always taken from either a mishnah or a baraita. Many of the homilies close with words of hope and encouragement regarding the future of the Jews; but several of them are abbreviated and not entirely completed, this curtailment being apologized for in the words "Much more might be said on this subject, but we shall not tire you", or "This passage has been elucidated by several other interpretations and expositions, but in order not to tire you we quote only that which is necessary for today's theme".

Contents 

Although essentially an aggadic midrash, Tanḥuma A contains many halakhic sayings. In addition to its 61 introductions to homilies, which contain halakhic questions and answers, there are several halakhic rules and decisions quoted throughout the work. These halakhic passages were taken from the Mishnah or the Baraita, and not from the Babylonian Talmud; indeed, many of the decisions given are in opposition to those of the latter work. The aggadic contents of the midrash are also very extensive and varied; it contains, too, simple explanations of Scriptural passages; several refutations of heretics; explanations of the differences between "ḳere" and "ketib" and between words written "plene" ("male") and defectively ("ḥaser"); interpretations according to noṭariḳon and gematria; several narratives and parables; and numerous aphorisms, moral sayings, and popular proverbs.

Some of the aphorisms and proverbs may be cited here: "One may not give an honest man an opportunity to steal, much less a thief". "The office seeks those that would escape it". "If you yield not to wickedness, it will not follow you nor dwell by you". "Do the wicked no good, in order that thou reap not that which is evil".

This Tanḥuma midrash has been referred to in many other midrashim, as, for example, all the Midrash Rabbot, Pesiḳta de-Rab Kahana, Pesikta Rabbati, and in the midrashim to Book of Samuel, Proverbs, and Psalms, which all quote passages from it. The Geonim also and the older rabbinical authorities made use of it, and cited halakhic as well as aggadic sentences from it. The first to refer to this midrash by the name of "Tanḥuma", however, was Rashi, who mentions it in several passages of his commentary, and quotes from it. Most of Rashi's quotations are taken from Tanḥuma A.

Tanḥuma B, or Yelammedenu 
This second midrash with which the name of Tanḥuma, largely known through its being quoted in later works is associated is known as the "Yelammedenu" from the opening words of the halakhic introductions to the homilies—"Yelammedenu rabbenu" (May our teacher instruct us). It is referred to also under the name of Tanḥuma, though by only a few authorities, as Hai Gaon and Zedekiah ben Abraham. The reason for this confusion of names may be found in the fact that a later collection of midrashim (Tanḥuma C) included a great part of the material contained in the Yelammedenu, especially that referring to the second book of the Pentateuch. The Yelammedenu, which contains several passages from Tanḥuma A, is often cited in the "Aruk," and has been extensively referred to by the redactor of the Yalḳuṭ. Other old rabbinical authorities refer to the Yelammedenu by that name, and quote passages from it; but otherwise the work has been completely lost.

Tanḥuma C
The third aggadic midrash to the Pentateuch bearing the name of Tanḥuma became the standard published edition, and it contains many passages taken from A and B. It is, in fact, an amended edition of the two earlier works, with various additions by later authors. Its homilies on Genesis are original, although they contain several revised passages from Tanḥuma A as well as from the Yelammedenu, the Babylonian Talmud being largely drawn upon for additional interpretations and expositions. The part referring to Exodus is borrowed almost entirely from the Yelammedenu, with the exception of the Vayakhel and Pekudei sections, which contain homilies not embodied in the lost work. For the portions to the books of Leviticus, Numbers, and Deuteronomy the redactor of this midrash has made extensive use of the material that he found in Tanḥuma A, which he has revised and supplied with numerous additions.

The first authority to cite this midrash was Rashi, who in some passages of his commentary refers to Tanḥuma C and not to the A collection. Because the third midrash contains much of the material of the lost Yelammedenu, the two works were often confounded. Some authorities believed that it was the Tanḥuma C and not the Yelammedenu which had been lost. Others erroneously considered this midrash identical with the Yelammedenu, thinking the work had a double title; and the first editions of Tanḥuma C appeared, therefore, under the title "Midrash Tanḥuma, Called Also the Yelammedenu."

Tanḥuma C was first published at Constantinople in 1522, and was reprinted without emendation at Venice in 1545. The third edition, which served as a basis for all the later editions, was published at Mantua in 1563 by Meïr ben Abraham of Padua and Ezra of Fano. This edition contains several additions, consisting of single sentences as well as of entire paragraphs, which Ezra of Fano selected from two of the original manuscripts and also from the Yalḳuṭ. Ezra indicated the added matter by marking it with open hands, but in the following editions these marks were omitted, so that it is no longer possible to distinguish between original contents and material added by revisers. Ezra of Fano further added to his edition an index of all halakhic decisions, as well as of the legends and parables contained in this midrash; this index has been retained in all later editions.

Digital Access
Tikkoun-Sofrim, a system that integrates automatic handwritten text recognition with manual, crowdsourced error correction has been used to digitize several manuscripts of the Midrash Tanhuma.

References

Jewish Encyclopedia bibliography 
 Zunz, G. V. pp. 226–238;
 Solomon Buber's Introduction (Mebo) to his edition of the Midrash Tanḥuma, Wilna, 1885;
Theodor, in Monatsschrift, 1885–86;
W. Bacher, Ag. Pal. Amor. iii. 500–514;
Weiss, Dor, iii. 268–273;
A. Epstein, Ḳadmut ha-Tanḥuma, in Bet Talmud, v. 7-23;
L. Grünhut, Sefer ha-Liḳḳuṭim, iv.-vi., Jerusalem, 1900.

External links 
Jewish Encyclopedia article on Tanhuma, by Wilhelm Bacher and   Jacob Zallel Lauterbach
מדרש תנחומא - Entire Midrash Tanchuma in Hebrew
Partial Text of Midrash Tanchuma in English
Limited Preview of Samuel A. Berman's Translation
Vol. 1 and Vol. 2 of the Buber edition of Midrash Tanhuma on Archive.org.
Midrash Tanchuma
Midrash Tanchuma - Buber

Aggadic Midrashim
Torah